Xuefugongyequ Station, is a station of Line 3 of the Tianjin Metro in China. It started operations on 28 December 2013.

References

Railway stations in Tianjin
Railway stations in China opened in 2013
Tianjin Metro stations